Bismuthate is an ion. Its chemical formula is BiO3−. It has bismuth in its +5 oxidation state.

It is a very strong oxidizing agent. It reacts with hot water to make bismuth(III) oxide and oxygen. It also reacts with acids. Sodium bismuthate is the most common bismuthate. It is one of the few sodium compounds that does not dissolve in water.

Related pages
Bismuth(III) chloride
Bismuth(V) fluoride, the other bismuth compound in its +5 oxidation state
Sodium bismuthate
 Sodium bismuth titanate

Bismuth compounds
Oxometallates